Frank Henry Bohlmann (1917-1999) was a guard in the National Football League. He played with the Chicago Cardinals during the 1942 NFL season.

References

Players of American football from Milwaukee
Chicago Cardinals players
American football offensive guards
Marquette Golden Avalanche football players
1917 births
1999 deaths